Newton's cannonball was a thought experiment Isaac Newton used to hypothesize that the force of gravity was universal, and it was the key force for planetary motion. It appeared in his posthumously published 1728 work De mundi systemate (also published in English as A Treatise of the System of the World).

Source of the experiment
Newton's original plan for Philosophiæ Naturalis Principia Mathematica was that it should consist of two books, the first analyzing basic laws of motion, and the second applying them to the Solar System.  In order to include more material on motion in resisting media, the first book was split into two; the succeeding (now third) book, originally written in a more popular style, was rewritten to be more mathematical. However, manuscripts of an earlier draft of this last book survived, and a version of it was published in 1728 as De mundi systemate; an English translation was also published earlier in 1728 under the name A Treatise of the System of the World. The thought experiment occurs near the start of this work.

Thought experiment
In this experiment from his book (pp. 5–8), Newton visualizes a stone (you could also use a cannonball) being projected on top of a very high mountain. If there were no forces of gravitation or air resistance, the body should follow a straight line away from Earth, in the direction that it was projected. If a gravitational force acts on the projectile, it will follow a different path depending on its initial velocity. If the speed is low, it will simply fall back on Earth. (A and B) for example horizontal speed of 0 to 7,000 m/s for Earth.

If the speed is the orbital speed at that altitude, it will go on circling around the Earth along a fixed circular orbit, just like the Moon. (C) for example horizontal speed of at approximately 7,300 m/s for Earth.

If the speed is higher than the orbital velocity, but not high enough to leave Earth altogether (lower than the escape velocity), it will continue revolving around Earth along an elliptical orbit. (D) for example horizontal speed of 7,300 to approximately 10,000 m/s for Earth.

If the speed is very high, it will leave Earth in a parabolic (at exactly escape velocity) or hyperbolic trajectory. (E) for example horizontal speed of approximately greater than 10,000 m/s for Earth.

Other appearances

An image of the page from A Treatise of the System of the World showing Newton's diagram of this experiment was included on the Voyager Golden Record (image #111).

See also

Space gun
Physics

Notes

External links
Newton Thought Experiment Simulator
Bucknell.edu – Astronomy 101 Specials: Newton's Cannonball and the Speed of Orbiting Objects
Drawing in the 1731 (2nd) edition of 'A Treatise of the System of the World' @ Google books
Newton's Cannon animation

Isaac Newton
Thought experiments in physics
Space guns